The Hôtel de Boisgelin, a.k.a. Hôtel de La Rochefoucauld-Doudeauville, is a hôtel particulier in Paris, France. It houses the Italian embassy in France. It has been listed since 1926 as a monument historique by the French Ministry of Culture.

Location
The Hôtel de Boisgelin is located at 47-49 on the Rue de Varenne in the 7th arrondissement of Paris.

History
The hôtel particulier as built in 1732 for Gérard Heusch de Janvry, a Secretary to the King of France. It was designed by French architect Jean-Sylvain Cartaud.

It is home to the Italian embassy in France.

References

Bibliography

External links

Boisgelin (Rue de Varenne, Paris)
Buildings and structures in the 7th arrondissement of Paris
Monuments historiques of Paris
Houses completed in 1732
1732 establishments in France
Italy
France
France–Italy relations